The 1999 Skate America was the first event of six in the 1999–2000 ISU Grand Prix of Figure Skating, a senior-level international invitational competition series. It was held at the World Arena in Colorado Springs, Colorado on October 27–31. Medals were awarded in the disciplines of men's singles, ladies' singles, pair skating, and ice dancing. Skaters earned points toward qualifying for the 1999–2000 Grand Prix Final. The compulsory dance was the Viennese Waltz.

Results

Men
Timothy Goebel made history by becoming the first person to land three quadruple jumps in one program. In the men's free skating, he landed a quad salchow, a quad toe loop in combination, and a quad toe loop as a solo jump.

Ladies

Pairs

Ice dancing

References

External links
 1999 Skate America

Skate America, 1999
Skate America